Strobilops labyrinthicus, common name the maze pinecone, is a species of air-breathing land snail, a terrestrial pulmonate gastropod mollusk in the family Strobilopsidae.

Its shell color is reddish brown and it has a height of 1.7-1.8 mm with a diameter of 2.3 mm. Its aperture is semicircular in shape, peristome reflected, brown. Older descriptions refer to it as Strobilops Labyrinthica.

Distribution 
This species of land snail occurs in the Eastern United States, from Texas northward to British America, Manitoba (Carberry), Ontario (Moose Factory) in Canada.

 Oklahoma

References

External links 

Strobilopsidae
Gastropods described in 1817